Anita Spring (born 26 June 1965 in Bundaberg, Queensland, Australia) is an Australian beach volleyball player who competed in the women's tournament of the 1996 Summer Olympics alongside Liane Fenwick.

References

Australian women's beach volleyball players
Beach volleyball players at the 1996 Summer Olympics
Sportspeople from Bundaberg
Sportswomen from Queensland
1965 births
Olympic beach volleyball players of Australia
Living people